The 1965 Tour de France was the 52nd edition of the Tour de France, one of cycling's Grand Tours. In his first year as a professional, Felice Gimondi, a substitute replacement on the  team, captured the overall title ahead of Raymond Poulidor, the previous year's second-place finisher.

Gimondi became one of only seven riders, the others being Alberto Contador, Vincenzo Nibali, Chris Froome and five-time Tour winners Jacques Anquetil, Eddy Merckx and Bernard Hinault to have won all three of the major Tours. Besides Gimondi's first tour and win, it was a first for other reasons: the 1965 Tour started in Cologne, Germany (the first time the Tour started in Germany, and only the third time it started outside France), and it was the first time the start ramp was used in time trials.

Jan Janssen, who won the points classification the previous year successfully defended his title; he won another points title in 1967 and the overall title at the 1968 Tour de France.

Julio Jiménez won two stages and his first of three consecutive mountains classification. Jiminez also won the mountains classification at the 1965 Vuelta a España – becoming one of (now) four riders to complete the Tour/Vuelta double by winning both races' mountains competitions in the same year.

Teams

The 1965 Tour started with 130 cyclists, divided into 13 teams of 10 cyclists. Each team had to include at least six cyclists with the same nationality.

The teams entering the race were:

 
 
 
 
 
 
 
 
 
 
 
 –

Pre-race favourites
Jacques Anquetil, who won the previous four Tours de France (1961–1964), did not participate in this tour. Cyclists in that time earned most of their income in criteriums, and Anquetil believed that even if he would win a sixth time, he would not get more money in those races.

This made Raymond Poulidor, who finished second in the previous Tour, the main favourite.

Other favourites were Italians Vittorio Adorni and Gianni Motta. Adorni had won the Giro d'Italia earlier that year, helped by his team-mate Felice Gimondi who finished third in his first year as a professional. Originally, Gimondi was not planning to start the 1965 Tour, but was asked to do so after several team-mates were ill.

Route and stages

The 1965 Tour de France started on 22 June, and had one rest day in Barcelona.

Race overview

The race started in Germany, and the first stage, ending in Belgium, was won by Belgian Rik Van Looy. On the second stage, run over cobbles, three riders escaped: Bernard Vandekerkhove, Felice Gimondi and Victor Van Schil. Vandekerkhove won the stage, and became the new leader.

On the third stage, there was again a group away, including Gimondi and André Darrigade. Darrigade was one of the best sprinters of that time, so Gimondi knew he would not win if it would end in a sprint. Gimondi therefore escaped with one kilometer to go. Gimondi was able to stay away, and won the stage; it was the first victory in his professional career. Gimondi also took the lead in the general classification, represented by the yellow jersey; this made Gimondi a protected rider in his team because his sponsor wanted to keep the publicity associated with the yellow jersey as long as possible.

The second part of the fifth stage was run as an individual time trial. It was won by Raymond Poulidor, but Gimondi was second, and kept his lead. He had a margin in the general classification of over two minutes on Vandekerkhove, while his team leader Adorni was in third place.

In the seventh stage, Adorni fell. His team-mates, including Gimondi, waited for him and lost some time; because of this, Vandekerkhove took back the lead.

The ninth stage was the first Pyrenean stage, and during that stage eleven riders abandoned because of sickness. This included the leader of the general classification Vandekerkhove, and also Adorni. Rumours about doping that went wrong circulated, but nothing was ever proven. Gimondi became the leader of the general classification again, and because his team leader Adorni had left the race, he also became the undisputed leader of this team.

There were two more days in the Pyrenees, but these gave no big changes in the general classification. After stage eleven, Gimondi was still leading, with Poulidor in second place, more than three minutes behind. Poulidor expected that the inexperienced Gimondi would fail somewhere, and expected fourth-placed Motta to be his biggest rival. Poulidor announced he would attack on Mont Ventoux in stage fourteen.

During that stage, Poulidor showed his strength, and won. He had a big margin over Motta, but Gimondi had stayed surprisingly close, and kept the lead in the general classification with 34 seconds.

In the following Alp stages, Poulidor did not attack; he planned to take the lead in the mountain time trial of stage eighteen. But this was won by Gimondi, who thus increased his lead.

The only realistic chance left for Poulidor to win back time was in the individual time trial that ended the race. Poulidor was a good time trialist, and on a good day he should have been able to win back enough time to win the race. But Gimondi was the fastest man that day, and won the stage, and thereby the Tour de France.

Classification leadership and minor prizes

There were several classifications in the 1965 Tour de France, two of them awarding jerseys to their leaders. The most important was the general classification, calculated by adding each cyclist's finishing times on each stage. The cyclist with the least accumulated time was the race leader, identified by the yellow jersey; the winner of this classification is considered the winner of the Tour.

Additionally, there was a points classification. In the points classification, cyclists got points for finishing among the best in a stage finish. The cyclist with the most points lead the classification, and was identified with a green jersey.

There was also a mountains classification. The organisation had categorised some climbs as either first, second, third, or fourth-category; points for this classification were won by the first cyclists that reached the top of these climbs first, with more points available for the higher-categorised climbs. The cyclist with the most points lead the classification, but was not identified with a jersey.

For the team classification, the times of the best three cyclists per team on each stage were added; the leading team was the team with the lowest total time. The riders in the team that led this classification wore yellow caps.

In addition, there was a combativity award given after each stage to the cyclist considered most combative. The split stages each had a combined winner. The decision was made by a jury composed of journalists who gave "stars". The cyclist with the most "stars" in all stages lead the "star classification". Felice Gimondi won this classification. The jury gave Cees Haast the prize more most unlucky cyclist, because he lost his sixth place in the general classification after a fall, and the prize for most sympathetic cyclist to Gianni Motta, because he was always in a good mood and did not look for apologies after losing to Gimondi. The Souvenir Henri Desgrange was given in honour of Tour founder Henri Desgrange to the first rider to pass the summit of the Col du Lautaret on stage 17. This prize was won by Francisco Gabica.

Final standings

General classification

Points classification

Mountains classification

Team classification

Combativity classification

Notes

References

Bibliography

External links

 
1965
1965 in French sport
1965 in road cycling
June 1965 sports events in Europe
July 1965 sports events in Europe
1965 Super Prestige Pernod